Madiraju may refer to:
 17042 Madiraju, a main-belt asteroid, named after ISFE awardee Anila Madiraju
 Madiraju Ranga Rao (born 1935), an Indian poet